Shahnabad, also rendered as Shahinabad, may refer to one of the following villages in Iran:

Shanabad, Hamadan Province
Shahnabad, Lorestan
Shahnabad, Razavi Khorasan
Shahinabad, Oshnavieh, West Azerbaijan Province
Shahinabad, Urmia, West Azerbaijan Province